Paramanandwadi  is a village in the southern state of Karnataka, India. It is located in the Raybag taluk of Belgaum district in Karnataka.

Demographics
 India census, Paramanandwadi had a population of 5111 with 2633 males and 2478 females.

See also
 Belgaum
 Districts of Karnataka

References

External links
 http://Belgaum.nic.in/

Villages in Belagavi district